Martini is a brand of Italian drinks, named after the Martini & Rossi Distilleria Nazionale di Spirito di Vino, in Turin.

History
Clemente Michel, Carlo Re, Carlo Agnelli and Eligio Baudino started the company in 1847, as a vermouth bottling plant in Pessione. A few years later Alessandro Martini joined the team, becoming the director in 1863 along with Teofilo Sola and Luigi Rossi (who was the inventor of a vermouth). In 1863 they changed the company name to Martini, Sola & Cia. They started exporting bottles of vermouth around the world. New York city was given its first crates in 1867. At the time the firm was awarded several prizes, which are still recorded on the bottles: Dublin (1865), Paris (1867 and 1878), Vienna (1873) and Philadelphia (1876). Just thirty years after its creation, Martini was available in the United States, Brazil, Argentina, Greece, Portugal, Belgium, Egypt and other countries.  In 1879 the Sola family sold its interests to the remaining partners, who renamed the company Martini & Rossi, as it stands today.

The brand may have given the American martini vermouth and gin cocktail its name (an early recipe for which is known from 1888), though other speculations on the cocktail's etymology exist.

In 1892 the business was taken over by Rossi's four sons; control passed to his grandsons in 1930. In 1929 the Martini Ball & Bar logo was registered for the first time. Restructuring was carried out in 1977 resulting in the creation of the General Beverage Corporation. In 1992 Martini & Rossi merged with Bacardi. “Martini is the world's fourth most powerful ‘spirit’ brand” according to a survey of the market in 2006.

In 1970 and 1971 Martini together with Rossi supported the so-called "Ladies Football World Championships". These tournaments were entirely independent from FIFA and the common national soccer associations. They were held in Rome and in Mexico.

Drinks 
Martini is made from four ingredients: wine, botanicals, sugar and alcohol

 Martini Rosso – 1863
 Martini Extra Dry – launched on New Year's Day 1900
 Martini Bianco – 1910
 Martini Rosato – 1980
 Martini D’Oro – 1998
 Martini Fiero – 1998 – new 2017
 Martini Soda
 Martini Riserva Montelera
 Martini Bitter – 1872
 Martini Brut
 Martini Rosé demi sec – 2009
 Martini Dolce
 Martini Prosecco
 Martini Asti
 Martini Gold by Dolce&Gabbana – 2010
 Martini Royale – 2012
 Martini Gran Lusso Limited Edition 150 years – 2013
 Martini Riserva Speciale Ambrato – 2015
 Martini Riserva Speciale Rubino – 2015
 Martini Riserva Speciale Bitter – 2017

See also
Martini (cocktail)

References

External links
Official website

Vermouth
Italian alcoholic drinks
Italian brands
Bacardi